Embassy of Ukraine in Portugal is the diplomatic mission of Ukraine in Lisbon, Portugal. Since 2015, the Ukrainian ambassador in Portugal has been Inna Ohnivez.

History of diplomatic relations

Portugal recognized the independence of Ukraine on January 7, 1992. Diplomatic relations between two countries were established on January 27, 1992. The embassy of Ukraine in Lisbon was opened in March 2000.

See also
 Portugal-Ukraine relations
 List of diplomatic missions in Portugal
 Foreign relations of Portugal
 Foreign relations of Ukraine

References

External links
 

Portugal–Ukraine relations
Portugal
Ukraine